Mississippi elected its member August 5–6, 1822.

See also 
 1822 and 1823 United States House of Representatives elections
 List of United States representatives from Mississippi

1822
Mississippi
United States House of Representatives